Jom-Bolok, also known as Volcano Valley and East Sayan Volcanic Field, is a volcanic field in Russia,  west of Lake Baikal. It is part of the Baikal rift zone which is also responsible for volcanism elsewhere around Lake Baikal. The volcanic activity has generated long lava flows and cinder cones.

Volcanic activity in the field commenced during the late Pleistocene in an area that had been previously influenced by glaciers and with even earlier volcanic and tectonic activity. Magma probably formed during deglaciation was erupted during the early Holocene, generating the long lava flow. A much more recent eruption in the southern part of the field may be referenced in Mongolian chronicles.

Geologic context 
It may be under the influence of the subducting Pacific plate regardless, as well as of the India-Asia collision, but more likely volcanism there is a consequence of a mantle plume. Other volcanic fields within  of Jom-Bolok are the Hangai, Khamar-Daban, Oka, Tuva and Vitim fields. These volcanic fields extend into Mongolia.

Like the Udokan plateau, Jom-Bolok is a volcanic field part of the Baikal rift which has been volcanically active during the Holocene. Volcanism there may be the consequence either of passive rifting or mantle plume activity and has been ongoing since the Mesozoic. The basement of this area was heavily folded and altered during the Tertiary, which was also affected by river incision and earlier eruptive activity.

Geology 
The field contains scora cones, lava flows and small cinder cones. Most of these cones are located within the Hee-Gol valley rather than the Jom-Bolok valley itself. These cones are constructed on top of three different faults.

This volume is comparable to the volume of lavas emitted during the 1973 Tolbachik eruption, albeit smaller than the Eldgja and Laki eruptions. This volume is unusual for a volcanic field of this size. This large eruptive volume may be linked to the effects of the ending ice age; the melting of the glaciers and resulting unloading of the crust would have resulted in a pre-existing subcrustal pond of magma to drain in a high volume eruption. The extreme length of the flow was likely also helped by the formation of lava tubes within the flow. The northern lava flow during its formation displayed some excellent thermal insulation, and it propagated by a process named sheet inflation where lava flows form thin sheets that subsequently grow to larger flows with a solid crust.

The Atkinson cone was probably formed during at least two separate stages, as did the Stariy cone which was destroyed during the early phase of activity and subsequently grew a secondary cone.

The Medvedev mound is associated with its own lava flow and peculiar lava features named "stony-flowers". The youngest lavas were erupted in the upper Khi-Gol valley from the Oka-Jombolok convergence where it assumes an aa morphology. That they don't appear in the intervening region may be because it was channeled through older lava tubes beneath the older lava flows. Lava flows from Jom-Bolok formed a lava dam that generated Lake Khara-Nur about 6,400 years ago.

Other fields around the Baikal rift have also hawaiites but are also associated with other volcanic rocks.

Climate, vegetation and basement rocks 

The vegetation is classified as "bald vegetation", which is a montane vegetation type; here it is characterized by birch, larch, Siberian fir willow. The volcanoes rise from Paleozoic intrusive rocks and various Pleistocene to Holocene sediments occur in the region; at higher elevation there is permafrost. The "Tannuola complex" is a Paleozoic rock assembly that forms the mountains around the volcanic field. Sediment cores taken in lakes of the area have been used to reconstruct the history of vegetation and climate during the Holocene.

Eruption history 
Volcanic activity in the field started 13,000 ka ago and took place in several separate phases, which have been grouped into one period lasting from 14,300 to 6,300 years ago and another beginning 1,600 years ago and possibly lasting to the present day. The last eruption occurred during the Holocene and has been dated at 5,180 BCE ± 140. Another date attributed to that cone is 7,130 BP ± 140. Stariy cone probably formed during early-postglacial time given the presence of glacial deposits beneath the cone's ash. This is also the age that has been attributed to the large northern lava flow; the crustal magma pond forming the flow may have formed during lithospheric unloading at the time of the Bolling-Allerod when glaciers in the East Sayan Mountains melted. The age of the Medvedev cone and flow are unknown. The eruptions at Jom-Bolok are the most voluminous Holocene eruptions of Central Asia; their volume has been estimated to be .

The youngest lavas are even more recent in age, 682–779 CE. One hypothesis formulated in 2015 assumes that the Irkut-Oka plateau may be the Ergune-Kun locality referenced in Mongolian chronicles. According to Mongolian chronicles 400 years before the birth of Genghis Khan the Mongols left Ergune-Kun under the lead of a Borte Chino, in coincidence with an event involving fire. The hypothesis suggests that the leaving of the Mongols coincides with the most recent eruption of Jom-Bolok which was witnessed by the Mongols and included in their chronicles.

The field probably formed in two stages, the long lava flow formed in the first stage in the Hee-Gol valley directly followed by the Atkinson, Ostanets, Peretolchin and Pogranichniy cones. The southern lava flow was preceded by the Stariy cone forming activity, at the end of the southern flow activity the Kropotkin and Treshina cones formed. Another theory believes the Stariy and Treshina cones formed first in the whole field. The most recent model states that Staryi and Treshchina erupted in the first phase, their lavas being buried beneath more recent eruption products. Atkinson, Ostanets and Peretolchin shortly afterwards then filled the valley with lava. Kropotkin erupted in the third phase and Pogranichnyi in the fourth, both being accompanied by activity at additional vents and the latter taking place about 900 years ago.

Volcanic activity such as at Jom-Bolok can cause the injection of  into the atmosphere. When such gas reaches the stratosphere it can cause temperature anomalies named volcanic winters. In the case of the northern field of Jom-Bolok, the total amount of  reaching the upper troposphere would be about  if one assumes a similar eruption in style to the Laki eruptions, which however took place at latitudes with a lower stratosphere. Local lakes show no evidence of tephra influence.

References

Sources 
 
 
 
 
 
 

Holocene volcanoes
Lava fields
Volcanism of Asia
Volcanoes of Russia